= Traualpsee =

- Location within Austria
- Location: Tyrol, Austria
- Coordinates: 47°27′N 10°31′E
- Type: lake

Traualpsee is a lake of Tyrol, Austria.
